The Tudors is a historical fiction television series set primarily in 16th-century England, created and written by Michael Hirst and produced for the American premium cable television channel Showtime. The series was a collaboration among American, British, and Canadian producers, and was filmed mostly in Ireland. While named after the Tudor dynasty as a whole, it is based specifically upon the reign of King Henry VIII.
 
The series was produced by Peace Arch Entertainment for Showtime in association with Reveille Productions, Working Title Television, and the Canadian Broadcasting Corporation, and was filmed in Ireland. The first two episodes debuted on DirecTV, Time Warner Cable OnDemand, Netflix, Verizon FiOS On Demand, Internet Movie Database and on the website of the series before the official premiere on Showtime. The Tudors premiered on 1 April 2007; it was the highest-rated Showtime series in three years. In April 2007, the show was renewed for a second season, and in that month the BBC announced it had acquired exclusive broadcast rights for the series in the United Kingdom, which it started to broadcast on 5 October 2007. The CBC began broadcasting the show on 2 October 2007.

Season Two debuted on Showtime on 30 March 2008, and on BBC 2 on 1 August 2008. Production on Season Three began on 16 June 2008 in Bray, County Wicklow Ireland, and that season premiered on Showtime on 5 April 2009, and debuted in Canada on CBC on 30 September 2009. The day after broadcast, downloadable episodes debuted in Canada on MoboVivo.

Showtime announced 13 April 2009, that it had renewed the show for a fourth and final season. The network ordered 10 episodes that were first broadcast on 11 April 2010. The series finale was broadcast on 20 June 2010. The final season was shown in Canada on CBC starting 22 September 2010, and ending on 23 November 2010.

International distribution rights are owned by Sony Pictures Television.

Synopsis

Season 1
Season 1 chronicles the period of Henry VIII's reign in which his effectiveness as king is tested by international conflicts and political intrigue in his own court. Cardinal Thomas Wolsey plays a major part, acting as Henry's trusted advisor.

In episode 1, Wolsey persuades Henry to keep the peace with France, and the two kings meet at Calais to sign a pact of friendship. The pressure of wanting a male heir compels Henry to question his marriage to Queen Catherine of Aragon. He also has a string of affairs and fathers an illegitimate son in episode 2 with his mistress Elizabeth Blount, who is also one of Queen Katherine's ladies-in-waiting. Henry has the traitorous Duke of Buckingham executed.

Anne Boleyn returns from attending the French court, and she catches Henry's eye. Her father and uncle encourage her to seduce the king, though she also falls in love with Henry as the season unfolds. She refuses to become his mistress but insists that he marry her, which pushes him to use Cardinal Wolsey to take action against the queen. The king instructs Wolsey to get papal dispensation for his divorce, on the grounds that his wife's marriage to his brother Arthur was indeed consummated. In episode 6, Wolsey makes increasingly desperate efforts to persuade the Catholic Church to grant a royal divorce, but this proves difficult as a result of the influence wielded over the Pope by Katherine's nephew Emperor Charles V, and this starts to weaken Wolsey's position.

In episode 7, the mysterious sweating sickness arrives in England, killing both the high-born and low-born, and Henry is terrified of catching it; he secludes himself in the countryside away from court with his herbal medicines. Anne Boleyn contracts the illness but recovers. A papal envoy arrives in England to decide on the annulment. The court convenes a special session at which both Henry and Katherine initially are present, and it eventually decides in favor of Katherine. Cardinal Wolsey is stripped of his office as Lord Chancellor in episode 9 and banished to York, where he pleads with the king to restore him to office. Henry chooses his loyal friend Sir Thomas More to be Wolsey's successor.

In the final episode, Wolsey makes one last desperate attempt to save himself by allying himself with his former enemy Queen Katherine, but their plot is discovered and Wolsey kills himself during his imprisonment in the Tower of London after saying a brief prayer apologising for his sins.

Season 2
Henry will do whatever it takes to marry Anne Boleyn, even defying Pope Paul III. He prepares to take Anne on a royal visit to France, having demanded loyalty from the English clergy. The papacy in Rome organises an assassination plot against Anne but this fails.

In episode 3 the newly appointed Archbishop of Canterbury Thomas Cranmer annuls Henry's marriage, clearing the way for Henry to marry the by now pregnant Anne, which also increases the growing rift between England and Rome. Bishop Fisher refuses to recognise the validity of Henry's marriage — after Henry issues a decree ordering all his subjects to recognise their new Queen — and is finally joined by Sir Thomas More, who is granted permission by Henry to retire from the chancellorship. In episode 5, Fisher and More's refusal to sign an oath of allegiance recognising Henry's supreme authority as head of the English church eventually leads to their execution.

In episode 6, Thomas Cromwell, who has become Henry's chief advisor, announces his plans to cleanse England of dissenters to the new regime. Also, England's relationship with France is complicated by King Francis's refusal to unite their kingdoms in marriage, thus causing Henry to question his decision to have married Anne. Episode 7 sees an increasingly ill and disillusioned Katherine who has been forbidden to see her daughter, Lady Mary, and Cromwell has legislation approved by Parliament agreeing to the dissolution of first the smaller and then the larger abbeys and monasteries.

In episode 8, Henry has Cromwell initiate overtures to the Emperor to make peace with Rome as a bulwark against a hostile France, and the king starts to pay court to Jane Seymour after Anne's two miscarriages which follow the birth of Princess Elizabeth. It is his long-time friend, Charles Brandon who, with Cromwell, alerts Henry to Anne's apparent indiscretions and her fate is sealed. She is conducted to the Tower of London and her four supposed lovers, one of whom is her own brother, are executed, followed eventually by her own exceution — delayed by some hours as a result of the French executioner's late arrival from Calais. Her devious father, who shows little remorse at the death of his son and Anne's impending death, is allowed to go free but is banished from court, and is shown leaving the Tower without even acknowledging his daughter waving from her cell window.

On the morning of his queen's execution, Henry enjoys a lavish breakfast, symbolically consisting of the mate of a swan he has seen outside his window, as he looks forward to a new start and heirs with Jane Seymour.

Season 3
The third season focuses on Henry's marriages to Jane Seymour and Anne of Cleves, the birth of his son Prince Edward, his ruthless suppression of the Pilgrimage of Grace, the downfall of Thomas Cromwell, and the beginnings of Henry's relationship with the free-spirited Catherine Howard.

Henry marries Jane as his third wife but his honeymoon period is soon spoilt by a growing resentment against the Reformation in the north and east of England. The growing band of rebels disperses in Lincolnshire but gathers strength in Yorkshire, primarily because of its able leaders such as Robert Aske and Lord Darcy. The royal troops, commanded by the Duke of Suffolk, are severely outnumbered and are forced to parley, whilst on the Continent the papacy sends a newly appointed English cardinal to persuade the Spanish and French monarchs to support the English rebellion, called the Pilgrimage of Grace by its followers as their objective is to restore the old Catholic religious practices.

In episode 3, Henry is determined to stop at nothing to suppress the revolt, his fears stirred by remembrances of the Cornish uprising during his father's reign. He deceitfully persuades the rebel leaders to lay down their arms and disperse their followers, promising to hold a Parliament in York to answer all their grievances; this is never held. A second uprising is savagely suppressed and the leaders executed as Henry, via Cromwell, instructs Suffolk to shed quantities of blood to act as an example. Queen Jane goes into labour and produces a son, but she dies soon afterwards. In episode 5, Henry retires from public view, bereft at the loss of his queen, but finally emerges: his first act is to get the church leaders to agree on a new protestant doctrine.

In the ensuing episodes, the king has the last remaining Plantagenet heirs, the Pole family (mother, son, and grandson), put to death as a result of Reginald Pole's attempts to undermine his rule. This creates a schism with Spain and France and, upon Cromwell's urging, Henry agrees to an alliance with the Protestant League by marrying Anne of Cleves after first dispatching the English Ambassador to Cleves to negotiate terms, followed by Hans Holbein who is to paint her likeness. However, Cromwell's plans to bolster the Reformation are undone by Henry's dislike for Anne, whom he calls a 'Flanders mare'. He is unable to consummate his marriage and vents his frustration on Cromwell, which is encouraged by the Duke of Suffolk in league with Edward Seymour, as both want Cromwell removed from office. With his enemies encircling him, Cromwell pleads with Anne of Cleves to submit herself to her husband, but she is powerless to reduce King Henry's antipathy towards her. Finally, Cromwell is taken to the Tower after being accused of being a traitor by the King's Council and, despite writing a letter begging his master's forgiveness, is gruesomely beheaded by an executioner, hungover due to a prior night of drinking with Cromwell's enemies in a final act of vengeance. Only intervention by the commander of the guard delivers Cromwell from his agony. 

In the meantime, Sir Francis Bryan is instructed by the Duke of Suffolk to find a woman to rekindle Henry's jaded love interest, and the beautiful and very young Catherine Howard, a relation of the Duke of Norfolk, is introduced at court and, catching the King's interest, he beds her in secret and a new romance begins.

Season 4
The fourth and final season covers Henry's ill-fated marriage to Catherine Howard and his final, more congenial, marriage to Catherine Parr. The ageing King seeks military glory by capturing Boulogne, France. In his final hours, he is troubled by the ghosts of his dead wives.

Henry marries 17-year-old Catherine Howard, and is besotted by her beauty, calling her "his rose without a thorn", and feels rejuvenated. Catherine starts to dally with the King's groom, Thomas Culpepper, and is encouraged by her senior lady-in-waiting, Lady Rochford — Henry's sister-in-law via Anne Boleyn's brother — who is also being bedded by Culpepper. In episode 2, Henry invites his former wife, Anne of Cleves, to court to celebrate Christmas as he wants to reward her for keeping her word to him and for her loyalty. She, in turn, is grateful for the charity he has shown towards her. After the festivities, he is struck down once again by his leg wound — from his former jousting days — while Catherine is with Culpepper.

Feeling the need for company, Henry visits Anne of Cleves and has a brief liaison with her. He and Catherine embark on the royal Passage to the North to forgive the former rebels, accompanied by Princess Mary, who is popular with the King's northern subjects. It is during this period that Catherine and Culpepper consummate their relationship and Catherine falls in love with him. In episode 4, Henry makes friendly overtures to the French ambassador, hoping to prevent an invasion, and Francis Dereham, Catherine's former lover when they both resided with the Dowager Duchess of Norfolk, arrives at court and blackmails the queen into making him her private secretary. Some weeks later Henry receives a secret letter about their prior sexual exploits.

In episode 5, the King grants permission to the Earl of Hertford to investigate the queen's alleged liaison with Dereham. He plans to pardon her but is then informed by his Council of her affair with Culpepper — revealed by Dereham under torture — and he has all three executed, along with Lady Rochford who has gone mad in the Tower. On the scaffold, Catherine states that, although Queen of England, she would have preferred to have been Thomas Culpepper's wife. In episode 6, Henry is courted by both Spain and Rome to form a military alliance against the French, who have allied with the Turks, and he is persuaded to form an alliance with the Holy Roman Emperor and invade France. Thomas Seymour introduces Catherine Parr at court and she catches the king's eye, even though married. Henry pursues her and sends Seymour to the Low Countries to remove him as a love rival.

Military preparations are made and English troops lay siege to Boulogne, bombarding it with cannon as an Italian engineer digs a tunnel to blow up the castle. Charles Brandon captures a French father and daughter and falls in love with the daughter, Brigitte. At home, Catherine Parr is acting as regent in Henry's absence and uses her power to further the protestant cause, but is checked by Bishop Gardiner and his Catholic faction, supported by Princess Mary. In episode 8, the castle of Boulogne is overcome and the keys to the city handed over to Henry by the French mayor. Henry returns to court in triumph, leaving the Earl of Surrey in charge of the new possession.

At home, Henry is disturbed by the struggle between the Catholic and protestant factions, and Catherine alienates him through her support of the protestant reformation. Bishop Gardiner continues his campaign against protestants, and gathers enough evidence to persuade the king to issue an arrest warrant against the queen for heresy. In the meantime, Henry Howard, now Lieutenant General Surrey, loses a disastrous battle at Boulogne and, whilst making an attempt to usurp power away from the 'new men' like the Seymours and Richard Rich, he is arrested, tried for treason and executed, despite the paucity of evidence against him.

In episode 10 an increasingly frail Henry is facing his own mortality. His mind is on the succession and he appoints the Earl of Hertford to be Lord Protector until Prince Edward comes of age. Catherine, knowing the mortal danger she is in, orders her ladies-in-waiting to destroy all their heretical books and no longer to discuss religious matters; she also submits herself to her husband and he pardons her. The dying Charles Brandon, is reunited with Henry for one final and nostalgic meeting. As the king's own end approaches, the ghosts of Henry's first three wives confront him over their deaths and his treatment of their children. Henry orders his family to spend Christmas at Greenwich, bidding them his final farewell and instructing the princesses Mary and Elizabeth to care for their brother. The final scene has him approving the portrait painted for him by Hans Holbein, depicting him as a virile, youthful King.

Cast

Episodes

Departures from history

Many events in the series differ from events as they actually happened in history. The series takes liberties with character names, relationships, historical costume, physical appearance, and the timing of events. As creator Hirst said, "Showtime commissioned me to write an entertainment, a soap opera, and not history. … And we wanted people to watch it." He added that some changes were made for production considerations and some to avoid viewer confusion, so "any confusion created by the changes is outweighed by the interest the series may inspire in the period and its figures."

General
 Time is compressed in the series, giving the impression that things happened closer together than they actually did. King Henry VIII was already in his mid- to late-30s by the time covered in the series. Catherine of Aragon had auburn hair and fair skin, much like her daughter Mary, and she was only six years older than Henry; he was approximately 10 years older than Anne Boleyn. Anne was recalled to Henry's court from France three years after her sister Mary Boleyn, not simultaneously, and Henry did not begin to court her until 1526. There was a period of seven years from Henry's infatuation with Anne until her coronation and his break from the Roman Catholic church. In the series, the timeline from introduction to marriage seems to take little more than a year. The assassination attempt on Anne during her coronation procession was a completely fictional event, invented by Hirst "to illustrate how much the English people hated her".
 Many characters were introduced to the series only when they would produce the most drama or when they become prominent in the story arc for some reason. In reality, Jane Seymour is believed to have become a lady-in-waiting to Catherine of Aragon around 1527; Anne Boleyn had been serving Catherine in the same capacity for five years at that point, which means that they were at court at the same time. Catherine Howard was lady-in-waiting to Anne of Cleves, and Henry's pursuit of her began during that time rather than after the end of his fourth marriage, as is shown in the series. Sir Francis Bryan is featured in the series only during Season 3, but he actually became a member of Henry's Privy chamber sometime between the king's ascent and 1519. He was instrumental in the machinations behind Anne's downfall, earning him the sobriquet "The Vicar of Hell". The Earl of Surrey was present in the court during the tenure of his cousin Anne Boleyn, but the series portrays him as coming back to England around the time that Jane Seymour became Queen.

First season
 The series begins with an entirely fictional scene in which an English ambassador (and uncle of the king) is murdered by a group of Frenchmen after being summoned to the palace of the Duke of Urbino. The furious Henry decides on war against France but is dissuaded by Cardinal Wolsey.
 Cardinal Thomas Wolsey died of an illness in Leicester in 1530 while en route to London to answer charges of treason. The series implies that this report of illness is part of a cover-up by Henry and Thomas Cromwell to prevent anyone from knowing that the cardinal had committed suicide.
 The Duke of Norfolk does not appear after season one of the series, implying that he retired. In reality, he played important roles in both the purge of the Boleyns and the suppression of the Pilgrimage of Grace, deeds fulfilled by Charles Brandon in the show.
 Henry's sister is called "Princess Margaret" in the series, but she is actually a composite of his two sisters, the life of his younger sister Princess Mary Tudor coupled with the name of his older sister Margaret Tudor. This was done to avoid confusion with Henry's daughter Mary I of England.
 Early in the series, Henry VIII is also styled as King of Ireland, a title which he did not use until his break from the Roman Catholic Church. Until that point, he was only Lord of Ireland.
 Louis XII has already died as the series begins, and Henry is already negotiating a peace treaty with Francis. The show's Princess Margaret thus marries a fictional, elderly Portuguese king who lives only a few days until she smothers him in his sleep. This composite character and her story technically eliminates the children who led to Mary, Queen of Scots and Lady Jane Grey.
 The king's illegitimate son Henry Fitzroy is born near the beginning of the series and dies at a young age from the sweating sickness. In fact, he lived until 1536, long enough to marry Mary FitzRoy, Duchess of Richmond and Somerset and to witness Anne Boleyn's execution.
 Charles V, Holy Roman Emperor is given a Spanish accent when dealing with the king of England, when in fact he was Flemish-born (though his mother Joanna of Castile was Spanish, and he was King of Spain (Castile and Aragon) as well as being Holy Roman Emperor).
 Sir Thomas More is seen ordering and attending the death of Simon Fish by burning at the stake. However, Simon Fish died in prison of bubonic plague.

Second season
 The Imperial Ambassador Eustace Chapuys is treated somewhat anachronistically for dramatic effect. He was a replacement for Íñigo López de Mendoza y Zúñiga, but this transition occurred earlier than in the show. Mary is told of his "death in Spain", but Chapuys died in Belgium well into Mary's reign, outliving Henry by nine years.
During the trial of Anne Boleyn, the series depicts George Boleyn, Mark Smeaton, Sir Henry Norris, and William Brereton being executed as co-conspirators. Francis Weston is omitted.
Paul III is depicted as suggesting that a character should join the Jesuits (milites Christi) and carry out the assassination of Anne Boleyn. Anne was crowned in 1533, and the first band of Jesuits did not assemble until 1534. Paul III remarks in the episode that he had approved their company, but he did not do so until 1540.

Third season
 The Countess of Salisbury (Princess Mary's governess) was executed during Catherine Howard's time as Queen-consort. In the series, however, she and her son, Lord Montagu are executed before Henry meets Anne of Cleves.
 The court of Cleves shows not the coat of arms of the United Duchies of Jülich-Cleves-Berg but of the Kingdom of Prussia of the 18th century.
 At the welcoming reception for Anne of Cleves, Henry introduces his daughters as "Princess." As both Mary and Elizabeth were still considered by Henry to be illegitimate, he would never have accorded them such a title, as it would in effect be declaring them legitimate. Neither Mary nor Elizabeth ever regained the title of Princess, and continued to be known as "Lady" until they each in turn succeeded to the throne.

Fourth season
 The incident of rape/murder, which marks the introduction of Sir Thomas Culpeper in the series, was a real event, but it took place in 1539, a full year before Catherine Howard's marriage to Henry and nearly two prior to the beginnings of Catrherine's affair with Culpeper. In reality, Culpeper was a favourite of Henry's at court and a knight of the realm, having served as a courtier for other nobility as early as 1535. He was a member of Henry's privy chamber by 1540, when he was a member of the envoy that greeted Anne of Cleves when she arrived in England to marry Henry. It is also unknown whether it was Sir Thomas Culpeper or his older brother, also called Thomas, who was guilty of the incident of rape/murder.
 After the annulment of his marriage with Anne of Cleves, it was only rumored that they had an affair: there is no evidence of this and it seems likely that Anne remained a virgin until her death. Anne is portrayed as being extremely popular, with just about everyone preferring her to Catherine Howard. It is true that both Mary and Elizabeth remained close to Anne and seem to have preferred her company to Catherine's.
 Catherine Howard was referred to as a "distant relation" of the 3rd Duke of Norfolk in the series. In reality, he was her uncle, just as he was to Anne Boleyn, who was Catherine's first cousin; Norfolk helped orchestrate both marriages. Contrary to the series' portrayal of the household of the Dowager Duchess of Norfolk as a shelter for distantly related "aristocratic bastards" and the resulting implication that Catherine Howard was an illegitimate child, in real life the Dowager Duchess was Catherine's step-grandmother, wife of Catherine's deceased grandfather the 2nd Duke of Norfolk, and Catherine was born to one of the 2nd Duke's many sons in lawful wedlock – she was sent to live in the household because her father was impoverished and recently widowed. Norfolk is also barely mentioned with regards to Henry Howard, Earl of Surrey, being called a mere kinsman to him, when in actuality Surrey was the Duke's eldest son and heir.
 By the time he married Catherine Howard, the real Henry was middle-aged (49) and obese, not a svelte, still relatively healthy man as portrayed on the show. This is perhaps quite relevant to appreciating historical context since Catherine's affair with Sir Thomas Culpeper and her declaration of true love to him on the block would sit better with a 17-year-old girl trapped in a marriage to a much older and obese king.
 A few liberties are taken with Catherine Parr as well. Parr is portrayed as meeting Henry while her husband, Lord Latimer, is still alive and she was a casual acquaintance of Mary's. In fact, she came to court only after his death, using her status as Catherine of Aragon's goddaughter to secure a place in Mary's household. Further, Mary is shown to be openly hostile towards Catherine Parr after discovering her Protestant views. In fact, Mary got on rather well with Parr and did not fall out with Catherine until after Henry's death. Even then, her hostility had little to do with religion: she was angered when the dowager Queen married Thomas Seymour so soon after Henry's death.
 Also, in season 4 during the execution of Lady Rochford and Catherine Howard, it is depicted in the series that Rochford was beheaded first. In fact this was the other way round and although Rochford appears to weep on the block, many accounts have praised both her and Catherine for their alleged bravery in the face of death. Though Rochford had suffered a nervous breakdown during her pre-execution imprisonment, the series exaggerates her mental instability just prior to her death. In reality, one eyewitness, a merchant named Ottwell Johnson, wrote that both Lady Rochford's and Catherine Howard's souls must be with God, for they made the most godly and Christian end.
 Catherine Parr was only four years older than Mary I and Mary was seventeen, when her younger sister Elizabeth was born. The series portrays Mary as much younger: barely an adolescent at the time of Elizabeth's birth and at least a decade younger than Catherine Parr. Also, Catherine Parr was a member of Mary's household at the time of Lord Latimer's death. Elizabeth, on the other hand, is depicted as being much older, with the series portraying her as a teenager, when Henry married Catherine Howard. Historically, she was six years old at the time. Although Laoise Murray does indeed bear resemblance to the historical Elizabeth, being pale-skinned and copper-haired, she looks nothing like the dark-haired Jonathan Rhys-Meyers (Henry VIII); historically, Elizabeth was the spitting image of her father, although she had her mother's eyes.
 Historians debate that Anne Askew was never given the mercy of a quick death through a sack of gunpowder tied to her neck. Witnesses say it took up to 15 minutes for her to die. Other details are accurate as her joints had been dislocated on the rack by the torturers depicted in the episode and she had to be brought to her execution, tied to a chair, removed in considerable agony to be tied to a seat on the stake. Other historians however support claims that Anne was given mercy through gunpowder death, but not through the direct work of Katherine Parr.
In the last episode of the final series, Henry commissions Hans Holbein the Younger to paint his portrait, and the final result is shown shortly before his death. However, the portrait depicted was actually painted almost a decade before his death, in 1536. Holbein, in fact, had pre-deceased Henry in 1543.

Reception

The premiere of The Tudors on 1 April 2007, was the highest-rated Showtime series debut in three years. On 23 March 2008, The New York Times called The Tudors a "primitively sensual period drama ... [that] critics could take or leave, but many viewers are eating up." A 28 March 2008 review, also by the New York Times, reported that "despite the scorching authenticity of some performances," in particular the "star-making, breakout performance of Natalie Dormer as the defiant, courageous proto-feminist martyr Anne Boleyn" the series "fails to live up to the great long-form dramas cable television has produced" largely because "it radically reduces the era's thematic conflicts to simplistic struggles over personal and erotic power."  According to the ratings site Metacritic, the show had 64% favourable reviews for the first season, 68% for the second season, 74% for the third season, and 63% for the fourth.

Ratings
In the United States, the first-season premiere drew almost 870,000 viewers. The premiere earned a combined one million views online and via cable affiliates.

Media releases

An original soundtrack for each season, composed by Trevor Morris, has been released by Varèse Sarabande.

Awards and nominations
The Tudors was nominated for the Golden Globe for Best Drama Series in 2007. Jonathan Rhys Meyers was also nominated for the Best Actor in a Television Drama Golden Globe for his role.

The series was nominated for eight Irish Film and Television Awards in 2008 and won seven, including Best Drama Series, acting awards for Jonathan Rhys Meyers (Lead Actor), Nick Dunning (Supporting Actor) and Maria Doyle Kennedy (Supporting Actress), and craft awards for Costume Design, Production Design and Hair/Makeup. Brian Kirk was also nominated for Directing, but lost to Lenny Abrahamson of Prosperity. The series won the 2007 59th Primetime Creative Arts Emmy Awards for Outstanding Costumes for a Series and Outstanding Main Title Theme Music. Later the series won six awards at the Irish Film and Television Awards in 2009 including Drama Series, Director, Actor in a Supporting Role, Actress in a Supporting Role, Costume Design and Make Up & Hair. In 2010 it was nominated for seven Irish Film and Television Awards, winning one in the category Best Supporting Actress in Television (Sarah Bolger).

See also
 List of The Tudors characters
 List of The Tudors episodes

Notes

References
 Burr, Oliver. The Secret Life of Henry VIII. Edinburgh University Press, Scotland, 1996.
 Davies, Norman. The Isles: A History. Oxford University Press, USA, 2001.
 Ives, Eric. The Life and Death of Anne Boleyn. Wiley-Blackwell, 2005.
 Sue Parrill and William B. Robison, The Tudors on Film and Television. McFarland, 2013.

External links
 

 
 
 The Tudors Wiki
 www.tudorsonfilm.com
 What The Tudors gets right about history

2000s British drama television series
2000s Canadian drama television series
2007 British television series debuts
2007 Canadian television series debuts
2010 British television series endings
2010 Canadian television series endings
2010s British drama television series
2010s Canadian drama television series
2007 Irish television series debuts
2010 Irish television series endings
BBC television dramas
CBC Television original programming
Cultural depictions of Henry VIII
Cultural depictions of Edward VI of England
Cultural depictions of Elizabeth I
Cultural depictions of Mary I of England
Cultural depictions of Anne Boleyn
Cultural depictions of Catherine of Aragon
Cultural depictions of Charles V, Holy Roman Emperor
Cultural depictions of Francis I of France
Cultural depictions of Thomas More
English-language television shows
Gemini and Canadian Screen Award for Best Drama Series winners
House of Tudor
Irish drama television series
2000s American LGBT-related drama television series
Gay-related television shows
Irish history television shows
Monarchy in fiction
Television series set in the 16th century
Serial drama television series
Showtime (TV network) original programming
Television series about the history of England
Television series by CBS Studios
Television series by Reveille Productions
Television series by Sony Pictures Television 
Television series by Working Title Television
Television set in Tudor England
Thomas Tallis
Cultural depictions of Margaret Pole, Countess of Salisbury